Existential Reckoning is the fourth studio album by rock supergroup Puscifer. The album was released on October 30, 2020, by Alchemy Recordings and BMG Rights Management.

Critical reception

Existential Reckoning received generally positive reviews from critics. At Metacritic, which assigns a normalized rating out of 100 to reviews from critics, the album received an average score of 80, which indicates "generally favorable reviews", based on 7 reviews.

Accolades

Commercial performance
Existential Reckoning debuted at number 7 on the US Billboard Top Alternative Albums chart with over 11,000 album-equivalent units, of which 9000 units were pure sales.

Track listing

Charts

References

2020 albums
Puscifer albums